Jagath Chamila Fernando (: born 6 June 1972) is an actor in Sri Lankan cinema, theatre and television. He made his film debut in 1992 in the Sinhalese film Guru Gedara, portraying a child. In 2013, he won the award for the Best Actor at New York International Film festival for his portrayal of Sami in Samige Kathava, a film based on Elmo Jayawardena's novel Sam's Story (2001). He is considered one of five actors who have dominated the Sri Lankan stage by critics.

Family
Chamila was born on 6 June 1972. His father, Tinil Fernando, was a school principal and his mother, Veenal Biatrice, is a housewife. He has two brothers, Ajith Tinil and Prasad Saman, and one, sister Nirosha Shayamali. Chamila is married to Piyumi Uthpala Dharmasri and they have one son, Pansilu Pavan, and one daughter, Venuri Kinara. Piyumi is the daughter of the film-maker Vijaya Dharmasri.

Career
Chamila's career as an actor started with stage dramas at school while he was a student at Prince of Wales' College, Moratuwa. After taking part in the school drama Samanala Kanda in 1986, he able to win the Best Actor awards in the inter-school drama competition from 1990 to 1992. He made his first film appearance in 1992 inGurugedara (Teacher's Home), directed by Vijaya Dharmasiri. He won the Best Actor award for his role in Sunil Chandrasiri's play Don Juan at the State Drama Festival in 2005. In 2013, he won the best actor's award for his leading role in Sameege Kathawa (Sam's Story) at the New York City International Film festival in New York.

Television serials

 Api Ape
 Api Api Wage I and II
 Aswenna
 Avul Haraya
 Bus Eke Iskole
 Girikula
 Govi Thaththa 
 Helankada
 Jayathuru Sankaya
 Jeewithaya Lassanai
 Jodu Gedara
 Kota Uda Mandira
 Maha Polowa 
 Maama Haa Ma
 Mama Nemei Mama 
 Manikkawatha 
 Miringu Sayura
 Nagenahira Weralin Asena
 No Parking
 Paradeesaya 
 Pawani
 Roda Hatara Manamalaya 
 Ruwan Maliga
 Sakura Mal
 Samanalakanda
 Sandagira 
 Sada Pinibidaka
 Sihina Genena Kumariye
 Sudui Usai
 Tharu Kumari
 Theth Saha Viyali 
 Udu Sulanga
 Verona
 Visuviyas Kandu Pamula
 Yasa Isuru

Filmography

Awards
 Best Actor Award in the inter-school drama competition - 1988, 1989, 1990 
 State Drama Award (Best Actor) for Don Juan - 2005 
 President award (Best supporting actor) for Asani Warsha - 2005 
 Raigam tele award (Best supporting actor) for Roda Hathare Manamalaya - 2005
 SIGNIS Tele Cinema Award (Best supporting actor) for Roda Hathare Manamalaya - 2005
 Sarasaviya Award (Special Jury Award) for Asani Warsha - 2005
 Sumathi Awards (Best Actor) for Swayanjatha - 2011 
 New York City International Film Festival (Best actor in a Leading role) for Sam’s Story - 2013
 Boden International Film Festival (Sweden) - Best Actor for Govi Thaththa- 2021

References

External links 

මම මේ දවස් වල ඉන්නේ දැඩි තිගැස්මකින්
‘සංගදාසගෙ චූටි කලිසම’ ඇඳලම බලමුද?
‘ඇම්ඩන්’ ස්වර්ණවාහිනියේ
A new play in town
ඇඟිලි කැපිලි පැත්තක දමා අංගුලිමාල කිති කවලා

Living people
Sri Lankan male film actors
Sinhalese male actors
1972 births